Kyle Alexander Daukaus (born February 27, 1993) is an American mixed martial artist who competed in the Middleweight division of the Ultimate Fighting Championship. He is the younger brother of fellow UFC fighter Chris Daukaus.

Background
Daukaus was raised in Northeast Philadelphia in the Tacony neighborhood, where he still lives and trains. When he was younger, Daukaus and his older brother Chris Daukaus would watch UFC fights together and then grapple with each other in their basement. Eventually, the brothers entered a grappling tournament, where both would finish second, despite having minimal formal training. The Daukaus brothers decided to take up MMA soon after, and both are now fighters in the UFC. After high school, Kyle weighed approximately 260 pounds, and his MMA coach suggested that he needed to take heavyweight bouts. Kyle would have a back-and-forth amateur fighting career, going 5–5 in his bouts. He would eventually drop down from 205 pounds to fight at 185 pounds, where he currently competes in the middleweight division.

Mixed martial arts career

Early career
Making his MMA debut at AFL 53, he faced Dino Juklo, submitting him via rear-naked choke in the first round. Daukaus would also to submit his next five opponents in Tyler Bayer, Kyle Walker, Elijah Gboille, Dustin Long, culminating in submitting Jonavin Webb via brabo choke at CFFC 72. At Dana White's Contender Series 18 he took on Michael Lombardo and defeated him via unanimous decision to pick up his first and only decision win at that point as a professional.

In the co-main event of CFFC 78, Daukaus submitted Stephen Regman in the second round via brabo choke. At CFFC 81 he tapped out Nolan Norwood via brabo choke in round two.

Ultimate Fighting Championship
Daukaus made his UFC debut as a short notice injury replacement for Ian Heinisch against Brendan Allen on June 27, 2020, at UFC on ESPN: Poirier vs. Hooker. He lost the fight via unanimous decision.

Daukaus faced Dustin Stoltzfus on November 21, 2020, at UFC 255. After dominating the bout, he won it via unanimous decision.

Daukaus was scheduled to face Aliskhab Khizriev on April 10, 2021, at UFC on ABC: Vettori vs. Holland. However, the bout was pulled from the card on April 7 due to COVID-19 protocols.

Daukaus faced Phil Hawes on May 8, 2021, at UFC on ESPN: Rodriguez vs. Waterson. He lost the fight via unanimous decision.

As the first bout of his new four-fight contract, Daukaus faced Kevin Holland on October 2, 2021, at UFC Fight Night 193. A clash of heads early into the fight knocked Holland unconscious briefly, but he continued to fight and was eventually submitted by Daukaus via a standing rear-naked choke. However, referee Dan Miragliotta reviewed the footage via replay and it was deemed the head clash led to the sequence of events resulting in Daukaus' win. Therefore, the fight was declared a no contest after the accidental headbutt. The rematch of the pair was scheduled on November 13, 2021, at UFC Fight Night 197. However, Holland withdrew from the bout due to injury and was replaced by Roman Dolidze. In turn, the bout was scrapped due to COVID-19 protocols related to Dolidze’s camp.

Daukaus was scheduled to face Julian Marquez on February 19, 2022, at UFC Fight Night 201. However, Marquez was pulled from the event for undisclosed reasons, and he was replaced by Jamie Pickett. He won the fight via D'Arce choke submission in the first round. The win earned Daukaus his first Performance of the Night bonus award.

Daukaus was rescheduled to face Roman Dolidze on June 18, 2022, at  UFC on ESPN 37. He lost the fight via knockout in round one.

Daukaus faced Eryk Anders on December 3, 2022, at UFC on ESPN 42. He lost the bout via TKO stoppage in the second round.

It was announced in late January 2023 that Daukaus had fought out his contract, and was not re-signed by the UFC.

Championships and accomplishments
Ultimate Fighting Championship
Performance of the Night (One time) 
Cage Fury Fighting Championships
Cage Fury Middleweight Championship (One time; former)
Two successful title defenses

Mixed martial arts record

|-
|Loss
|align=center|11–4 (1)
|Eryk Anders
|TKO (punches)
|UFC on ESPN: Thompson vs. Holland
|
|align=center|2
|align=center|2:45
|Orlando, Florida, United States
|
|-
|Loss
|align=center|11–3 (1)
|Roman Dolidze
|KO (knee and punches)
|UFC on ESPN: Kattar vs. Emmett
|
|align=center|1
|align=center|1:13
|Austin, Texas, United States
|
|-
|Win
|align=center|11–2 (1)
|Jamie Pickett
|Submission (brabo choke)
|UFC Fight Night: Walker vs. Hill
|
|align=center|1
|align=center|4:59
|Las Vegas, Nevada, United States
|
|-
|NC
|align=center|10–2 (1)
|Kevin Holland
|NC (accidental clash of heads)
|UFC Fight Night: Santos vs. Walker
|
|align=center|1
|align=center|3:43
|Las Vegas, Nevada, United States
|
|-
| Loss
| align=center| 10–2
|Phil Hawes
| Decision (unanimous)
| UFC on ESPN: Rodriguez vs. Waterson
| 
| align=center| 3
| align=center| 5:00
| Las Vegas, Nevada, United States
| 
|-
| Win
| align=center| 10–1
| Dustin Stoltzfus
|Decision (unanimous)
|UFC 255
|
|align=center| 3
|align=center| 5:00
|Las Vegas, Nevada, United States
|
|-
| Loss
| align=center| 9–1
|Brendan Allen
|Decision (unanimous)
|UFC on ESPN: Poirier vs. Hooker
|
|align=center|3
|align=center|5:00
|Las Vegas, Nevada, United States
|
|-
| Win
| align=center| 9–0
|Nolan Norwood
| Submission (brabo choke)
| CFFC 81: Sabatini vs. Gonzalez
| 
| align=center| 2
| align=center| 4:36
| Bensalem, Pennsylvania, United States
| 
|-
| Win
| align=center| 8–0
| Stephen Regman
|Submission (brabo choke)
|CFFC 78: Santella vs. Shutt
|
|align=center| 2
|align=center| 0:52
|Philadelphia, Pennsylvania, United States
|
|-
| Win
| align=center| 7–0
|Michael Lombardo
|Decision (unanimous)
|Dana White's Contender Series 18
|
|align=center|3
|align=center|5:00
|Las Vegas, Nevada, United States
|
|-
| Win
| align=center|6–0
|Jonavin Webb
|Technical Submission (brabo choke)
|CFFC 72: Brady vs. Abdul-Hakim
|
|align=center|3
|align=center|5:00
|Atlantic City, New Jersey, United States
|
|-
| Win
| align=center| 5–0
| Dustin Long
|Submission (rear-naked choke)
|Ring of Combat 66
|
|align=center|1
|align=center|2:51
|Atlantic City, New Jersey, United States
|
|-
| Win
| align=center| 4–0
|Elijah Gbollie
| Submission (rear-naked choke)
| Art of War Cage Fighting 5
| 
| align=center| 2
| align=center| 4:30
| Philadelphia, Pennsylvania, United States
|
|-
| Win
| align=center|3–0
| Tyler Bayer
|Submission (brabo choke)
| CFFC 69
|
| align=center|2
| align=center|2:32
|Atlantic City, New Jersey, United States
|
|-
| Win
| align=center| 2–0
| Kyle Walker
| Submission (brabo choke)
|KOTC: Regulator
|
| align=center|1
| align=center|1:41
|Stroudsburg, Pennsylvania, United States
|
|-
| Win
| align=center|1–0
| Dino Juklo
| Submission (rear-naked choke)
|Asylum Fight League 53
|
|align=center|1
|align=center|2:35
|Philadelphia, Pennsylvania, United States
|

See also 

 List of male mixed martial artists

References

External links 
  
 

1993 births
Living people
American male mixed martial artists
Sportspeople from Philadelphia
Mixed martial artists from Pennsylvania
Middleweight mixed martial artists
Mixed martial artists utilizing Muay Thai
Mixed martial artists utilizing Brazilian jiu-jitsu
Ultimate Fighting Championship male fighters
American practitioners of Brazilian jiu-jitsu
People awarded a black belt in Brazilian jiu-jitsu
American Muay Thai practitioners